Day trading is a form of speculation in securities in which a trader buys and sells a financial instrument within the same trading day, so that all positions are closed before the market closes for the trading day to avoid unmanageable risks and negative price gaps between one day's close and the next day's price at the open. Traders who trade in this capacity are generally classified as speculators. Day trading contrasts with the long-term trades underlying buy-and-hold and value investing strategies. Day trading may require fast trade execution, sometimes as fast as milli-seconds in scalping, therefore direct-access day trading software is often needed. 

Day traders generally use leverage such as margin loans; in the United States, Regulation T permits an initial maximum leverage of 2:1, but many brokers will permit 4:1 intraday leverage as long as the leverage is reduced to 2:1 or less by the end of the trading day. In the United States, based on rules by the Financial Industry Regulatory Authority, people who make more than 3 day trades per 5-trading-day period are termed pattern day traders and are required to maintain $25,000 in equity in their accounts. However, a day trader with the legal minimum of $25,000 in their account can buy $100,000 (4× leverage) worth of stock during the day, as long as half of those positions are exited before the market close. Because of the high risk of margin use, and of other day trading practices, a day trader will often have to exit a losing position very quickly, in order to prevent a greater, unacceptable loss, or even a disastrous loss, much larger than their original investment, or even larger than their account value. Since margin interest is typically only charged on overnight balances, the trader may pay no interest fees for the margin loan, though still running the risk of margin calls. Margin interest rates are usually based on the broker's call rate.

Some of the more commonly day-traded financial instruments are stocks, options, currency (including cryptocurrency), contracts for difference, and futures contracts such as stock market index futures, interest rate futures, currency futures and commodity futures.

Day trading was once an activity that was exclusive to financial firms and professional speculators. Many day traders are bank or investment firm employees working as specialists in equity investment and investment management. Day trading gained popularity after the deregulation of commissions in the United States in 1975, the advent of electronic trading platforms in the 1990s, and with the stock price volatility during the dot-com bubble. Recent 2020 pandemic lockdowns and following market volatility has caused a significant number of retail traders to enter the market. 

Some day traders use an intra-day technique known as scalping that has the trader holding a position briefly, for a few minutes to only seconds. 

Day traders may be professionals that work for large financial institutions, are trained by other professionals or mentors, do not use their own capital, or receive a base salary of approximately $50,000 to $70,000 as well as the possibility for bonuses of 10%–30% of the profits realized. Individuals can day trade with as little as $100, or even less, with fractional shares.

Profitability and risks
Because of the nature of financial leverage and the rapid returns that are possible, day trading results can range from extremely profitable to extremely unprofitable; high-risk profile traders can generate either huge percentage returns or huge percentage losses.
 
Day trading is risky, and the U.S. Securities and Exchange Commission has made the following warnings to day traders:
 Be prepared to suffer severe financial losses
 Day traders do not "invest"
 Day trading is an extremely stressful and expensive full-time job
 Day traders depend heavily on borrowing money or buying stocks on margin
 Don't believe claims of easy profits
 Watch out for "hot tips" and "expert advice" from newsletters and websites catering to day traders
 Remember that "educational" seminars, classes, and books about day trading may not be objective
 Check out day trading firms with your state securities regulator

Most day traders lose money.

An article in Forbes quoting someone from an educational trading website stated that "the success rate for day traders is estimated to be around only 10%, so ... 90% are losing money," adding "only 1% of [day] traders really make money."

Techniques
Day trading requires a sound and rehearsed method to provide a statistical edge on each trade and should not be engaged without proper knowledge and education.  Although trading knowledge were previously only for Wall Street, now the education and strategy has been readily available for normal traders as well. Several classic books are available for day traders such as How to Day Trade for a Living by Andrew Aziz or Trading for a Living by Dr Alexander Elder. 

The following are several basic trading strategies by which day traders attempt to make profits. In addition, some day traders also use contrarian investing strategies (more commonly seen in algorithmic trading) to trade specifically against irrational behavior from day traders using the approaches below. It is important for a trader to remain flexible and adjust  techniques to match changing market conditions.

Some of these approaches require short selling stocks; the trader borrows stock from their broker and sells the borrowed stock, hoping that the price will fall and they will be able to purchase the shares at a lower price, thus keeping the difference as their profit. There are several technical problems with short sales: the broker may not have shares to lend in a specific issue, the broker can call for the return of its shares at any time, and some restrictions are imposed in America by the U.S. Securities and Exchange Commission on short-selling (see uptick rule for details). Some of these restrictions (in particular the uptick rule) don't apply to trades of stocks that are actually shares of an exchange-traded fund (ETF).

Minimizing risk capital
Many successful day traders risk less than 1% to 2% of their account per trade.

Trend following
Trend following, or momentum trading, is a strategy used in all trading time-frames, assumes that financial instruments which have been rising steadily will continue to rise, and vice versa with falling. Traders can profit by buying an instrument which has been rising, or short selling a falling one, in the expectation that the trend will continue. These traders use technical analysis to identify trends.

Contrarian investing
Contrarian investing is a market timing strategy used in all trading time-frames. It assumes that financial instruments that have been rising steadily will reverse and start to fall, and vice versa. The contrarian trader buys an instrument which has been falling, or short-sells a rising one, in the expectation that the trend will change.

Range trading
Range trading, or range-bound trading, is a trading style in which stocks are watched that have either been rising off a support price or falling off a resistance price. That is, every time the stock hits a high, it falls back to the low, and vice versa. Such a stock is said to be "trading in a range", which is the opposite of trending. The range trader therefore buys the stock at or near the low price, and sells (and possibly short sells) at the high. A related approach to range trading is looking for moves outside of an established range, called a breakout (price moves up) or a breakdown (price moves down), and assume that once the range has been broken prices will continue in that direction for some time.

Scalping
Scalping was originally referred to as spread trading. Scalping is a trading style where small price gaps created by the bid–ask spread are exploited by the speculator. It normally involves establishing and liquidating a position quickly, usually within minutes or even seconds.

Scalping highly liquid instruments for off-the-floor day traders involves taking quick profits while minimizing risk (loss exposure). It applies technical analysis concepts such as over/under-bought, support and resistance zones as well as trendline, trading channel to enter the market at key points and take quick profits from small moves. The basic idea of scalping is to exploit the inefficiency of the market when volatility increases and the trading range expands. Scalpers also use the "fade" technique. When stock values suddenly rise, they short sell securities that seem overvalued.

Rebate trading
Rebate trading is an equity trading style that uses ECN rebates as a primary source of profit and revenue. Most ECNs charge commissions to customers who want to have their orders filled immediately at the best prices available, but the ECNs pay commissions to buyers or sellers who "add liquidity" by placing limit orders that create "market-making" in a security. Rebate traders seek to make money from these rebates and will usually maximize their returns by trading low priced, high volume stocks. This enables them to trade more shares and contribute more liquidity with a set amount of capital, while limiting the risk that they will not be able to exit a position in the stock.

Trading the news
The basic strategy of trading the news is to buy a stock which has just announced good news, or short sell on bad news. Such events provide enormous volatility in a stock and therefore the greatest chance for quick profits (or losses). Determining whether news is "good" or "bad" must be determined by the price action of the stock, because the market reaction may not match the tone of the news itself. This is because rumors or estimates of the event (like those issued by market and industry analysts) will already have been circulated before the official release, causing prices to move in anticipation. The price movement caused by the official news will therefore be determined by how good the news is relative to the market's expectations, not how good it is in absolute terms.

Price action trading
Price action trading relies on technical analysis but does not rely on conventional indicators. These traders rely on a combination of price movement, chart patterns, volume, and other raw market data to gauge whether or not they should take a trade. This is seen as a "minimalist" approach to trading but is not by any means easier than any other trading methodology. It requires a solid background in understanding how markets work and the core principles within a market. However, the benefit for this methodology is that it is effective in virtually any market (stocks, foreign exchange, futures, gold, oil, etc.).

Market-neutral trading
Market-neutral trading is a strategy that is designed to mitigate risk in which a trader takes a long position in one security and a short position in another security that is related.

Algorithmic trading
It is estimated that more than 75% of stock trades in United States are generated by algorithmic trading or high-frequency trading. The increased use of algorithms and quantitative techniques has led to more competition and smaller profits. Algorithmic trading is used by banks and hedge funds as well as retail traders. Retail traders can buy commercially available automated trading systems or develop their own automatic trading software.

Cost

Commission
Commissions for direct access trading, such as that offered by Interactive Brokers are calculated based on volume, and are usually 0.5 cents per share or $0.25 per futures contract. The more shares traded, the cheaper the commission. Most brokers in the United States, especially those that receive payment for order flow do not charge commissions.

Spread
The numerical difference between the bid and ask prices is referred to as the bid–ask spread. Most worldwide markets operate on a bid-ask-based system.

The ask prices are immediate execution (market) prices for quick buyers (ask takers) while bid prices are for quick sellers (bid takers). If a trade is executed at quoted prices, closing the trade immediately without queuing would always cause a loss because the bid price is always less than the ask price at any point in time.  

The bid–ask spread is two sides of the same coin. The spread can be viewed as trading bonuses or costs according to different parties and different strategies. On one hand, traders who do NOT wish to queue their order, instead paying the market price, pay the spreads (costs). On the other hand, traders who wish to queue and wait for execution receive the spreads (bonuses). Some day trading strategies attempt to capture the spread as additional, or even the only, profits for successful trades.

Market data
Market data is necessary for day traders to be competitive. A real-time data feed requires paying fees to the respective stock exchanges, usually combined with the broker's charges; these fees are usually very low compared to the other costs of trading. The fees may be waived for promotional purposes or for customers meeting a minimum monthly volume of trades. Even a moderately active day trader can expect to meet these requirements, making the basic data feed essentially "free". In addition to the raw market data, some traders purchase more advanced data feeds that include historical data and features such as scanning large numbers of stocks in the live market for unusual activity. Complicated analysis and charting software are other popular additions. These types of systems can cost from tens to hundreds of dollars per month to access.

History
Before 1975, stockbrokerage commissions in the United States were fixed at 1% of the amount of the trade, i.e. to purchase $10,000 worth of stock cost the buyer $100 in commissions and same 1% to sell and traders had to make over 2% to cover their costs, which was not likely in a single trading day.

In 1975, the U.S. Securities and Exchange Commission (SEC) made fixed commission rates illegal and commission rates dropped significantly.

Financial settlement periods used to be much longer. Before the early 1990s at the London Stock Exchange, for example, stock could be paid for up to 10 working days after it was bought, allowing traders to buy (or sell) shares at the beginning of a settlement period only to sell (or buy) them before the end of the period hoping for a rise in price. This activity was identical to modern day trading, but for the longer duration of the settlement period. But today, to reduce market risk, the settlement period is typically T+2 (two working days) and brokers usually require that funds are posted in advance of any trade. Reducing the settlement period reduces the likelihood of default, but was impossible before the advent of electronic ownership transfer.

Electronic communication networks
Electronic communication networks (ECNs), large proprietary computer networks on which brokers can list a certain amount of securities to sell at a certain price (the asking price or "ask") or offer to buy a certain amount of securities at a certain price (the "bid"), first became a factor with the launch of Instinet in 1969. However, at first, they generally offered better pricing to large traders.

The next important step in facilitating day trading was the founding in 1971 of NASDAQ - a virtual stock exchange on which orders were transmitted electronically. Moving from paper share certificates and written share registers to "dematerialized" shares, traders used computerized trading and registration that required not only extensive changes to legislation but also the development of the necessary technology: online and real time systems rather than batch; electronic communications rather than the postal service, telex or the physical shipment of computer tapes, and the development of secure cryptographic algorithms.

These developments heralded the appearance of "market makers": the NASDAQ equivalent of a NYSE specialist. A market maker has an inventory of stocks to buy and sell, and simultaneously offers to buy and sell the same stock. Obviously, it will offer to sell stock at a higher price than the price at which it offers to buy. This difference is known as the "spread". The market maker is indifferent as to whether the stock goes up or down, it simply tries to constantly buy for less than it sells. A persistent trend in one direction will result in a loss for the market maker, but the strategy is overall positive (otherwise they would exit the business). Today there are about 500 firms who participate as market makers on ECNs, each generally making a market in four to forty different stocks. Without any legal obligations, market makers were free to offer smaller spreads on electronic communication networks than on the NASDAQ.

After Black Monday (1987), the SEC adopted "Order Handling Rules" which required market makers to publish their best bid and ask on the NASDAQ.

Another reform made was the "Small-order execution system", or "SOES", which required market makers to buy or sell, immediately, small orders (up to 1,000 shares) at the market maker's listed bid or ask. The design of the system gave rise to arbitrage by a small group of traders known as the "SOES bandits", who made sizable profits buying and selling small orders to market makers by anticipating price moves before they were reflected in the published inside bid/ask prices. The SOES system ultimately led to trading facilitated by software instead of market makers via ECNs.

In the late 1990s, existing ECNs began to offer their services to small investors. New ECNs arose, most importantly Archipelago (NYSE Arca) Instinet, SuperDot, and Island ECN. Archipelago eventually became a stock exchange and in 2005 was purchased by the NYSE. 

The ability for individuals to day trade via electronic trading platforms coincided with the extreme bull market in technological issues from 1997 to early 2000, known as the dot-com bubble. From 1997 to 2000, the NASDAQ rose from 1,200 to 5,000. Many naive investors with little market experience made huge profits buying these stocks in the morning and selling them in the afternoon, at 400% margin rates. An unprecedented amount of personal investing occurred during the boom and stories of people quitting their jobs to day trade were common.

In March 2000, this bubble burst, and many less-experienced day traders began to lose money as fast, or faster, than they had made during the buying frenzy. The NASDAQ crashed from 5000 back to 1200; many of the less-experienced traders went broke, although obviously it was possible to have made a fortune during that time by short selling or playing on volatility.

In parallel to stock trading, starting at the end of the 1990s, several new market maker firms provided foreign exchange and derivative day trading through electronic trading platforms. These allowed day traders to have instant access to decentralised markets such as forex and global markets through derivatives such as contracts for difference. Most of these firms were based in the UK and later in less restrictive jurisdictions, this was in part due to the regulations in the US prohibiting this type of over-the-counter trading. These firms typically provide trading on margin allowing day traders to take large position with relatively small capital, but with the associated increase in risk. The retail foreign exchange trading became popular to day trade due to its liquidity and the 24-hour nature of the market.

See also
Everything bubble
GameStop short squeeze
price action trading

References

Share trading